Christopher T. Head (born January 13, 1963) is an American politician. A Republican, he was elected to the Virginia House of Delegates in 2011. He represents the 17th district, made up parts of Botetourt and Roanoke counties and the city of Roanoke, in the western part of the state.

Early life, education, business career
Chris Head grew up in Commerce, Georgia. He received a BMus degree from the University of Georgia in 1985. Shortly after he moved to Virginia, where he was a small business owner. In 2001, Chris and his wife, Besty, co-founded their first  They have three children. He is a deacon at his church, Bonsack Baptist, and sings in the choir. He is a member of multiple civic and philanthropic organizations in the Roanoke Valley and in 2009 was awarded the Roanoke Regional Small Business of the Year.

Political career
When William Fralin retired in 2009 from his 17th House of Delegate seat, Head ran for the Republican nomination. He finished second in a five-way primary to William Cleaveland.

Cleaveland chose not to run for a second term in 2011, and Head was nominated to replace him. Head defeated Democratic candidate Freeda S. Cathcart in the general election, 11852-6207.

Head is a member of the Appropriations; Health, Welfare & Institutions; and Military, Police, & Public Safety Committees. He also serves on the Joint Committee on Administrative Rules, which reviews regulations of the executive branch. He is also the founder and chairman of the Business Development Caucus in the House of Delegates.

Electoral history

Notes

External links

 (campaign/constituent website)

1963 births
Living people
Republican Party members of the Virginia House of Delegates
University of Georgia alumni
People from Commerce, Georgia
21st-century American politicians